Saša Planinšec (born 2 June 1995) is a Slovenian female volleyball player who plays as a middle-blocker for Aydın Büyükşehir Belediyespor.

Career
On 21 April 2021, Planinšec signed a one-year contract with Galatasaray.

References

External links
Player profile at Volleybox.net

1995 births
Living people
Sportspeople from Maribor
Slovenian women's volleyball players
Galatasaray S.K. (women's volleyball) players
Slovenian expatriate sportspeople in Germany
Expatriate volleyball players in Germany
Slovenian expatriate sportspeople in China
Expatriate volleyball players in China
Slovenian expatriate sportspeople in Turkey
Expatriate volleyball players in Turkey